Fortuna Peak is a peak,  high, standing at the east side of Fortuna Bay, on the north coast of South Georgia. The name appears to be first used on a 1931 British Admiralty chart, and is probably in association with Fortuna Bay.

See also
Harper Peak

References 

Mountains and hills of South Georgia